Nathan Harriel (born April 23, 2001) is an American professional soccer player who plays as a defender for the Philadelphia Union of Major League Soccer.

Career 
Harriel appeared as an amateur player for USL Championship side Bethlehem Steel during their 2019 season, as well as being part of the Philadelphia Union academy.

In 2019, Harriel verbally committed to play college soccer at Clemson University. However, on July 17, 2020, Harriel signed with Philadelphia Union as a homegrown player, beginning from the 2021 season. They acquired his homegrown rights from Orlando City SC in exchange for a first round 2021 MLS SuperDraft pick.

Harriel was first named to senior matchday squads during the 2021 season, and made his senior debut on September 3, playing at right back. Both players who had played in the position during the season, Olivier Mbaizo and Alvas Powell, were away on international duty.

Career statistics

References

External links 
 
 

2001 births
Living people
American soccer players
Association football defenders
Homegrown Players (MLS)
Philadelphia Union II players
Philadelphia Union players
People from Oldsmar, Florida
Soccer players from Florida
Sportspeople from Pinellas County, Florida
USL Championship players
Major League Soccer players
MLS Next Pro players